Ernst Hilding Waldemar Nilsson (10 May 1891 – 11 February 1971) was a Swedish heavyweight wrestler who competed at the 1912, 1920 and 1924 Summer Olympics. He won a bronze medal in freestyle wrestling in 1920 and placed fourth-fifth in the Greco-Roman and freestyle contests in 1924. Nilsson won two world titles in Greco-Roman wrestling, in 1913 and 1922.

References

External links
 

1891 births
1971 deaths
Olympic wrestlers of Sweden
Wrestlers at the 1912 Summer Olympics
Wrestlers at the 1920 Summer Olympics
Wrestlers at the 1924 Summer Olympics
Swedish male sport wrestlers
Olympic bronze medalists for Sweden
Olympic medalists in wrestling
Medalists at the 1920 Summer Olympics
World Wrestling Championships medalists
Sportspeople from Malmö
20th-century Swedish people